The Alstom Flexity (sold as Bombardier Flexity before 2021, stylized in all caps) is a family of modern trams, streetcars and light rail vehicles manufactured by Bombardier Transportation, since 2021 a division of French company Alstom. As of 2015, more than 3,500 Flexity vehicles are in operation around the world in Europe, Asia, Oceania, and North America in 100 cities among 20 countries internationally. Production of the vehicles is done at Bombardier's global production plants and by local manufacturers worldwide through technology transfer agreements.

Inside Alstom, the Flexity supplements the Citadis range. Third-party competitors include Siemens Mobility's Combino, Avanto and Avenio, Stadler Rail's Tango and Variobahn, CAF's Urbos, and AnsaldoBreda's Sirio globally, and Siemens USA's S70/S700, U2, SD-100, SD-160, SD-400, SD-460, and S200, along with LRVs and streetcars from Kinki Sharyo, Brookville Equipment Corporation and Škoda/Inekon/United Streetcar in North America.

Overview 
 
Flexity trams and LRVs usually belong to one of six standard models. Manufactured from corrosion-resistant carbon steel and featuring driver's cabs made with glass-reinforced plastic, they have a modular design that is customizable to meet specific operators' demands, including a variety of track gauges and voltages. The modules can also be replaced easily in case of damage.

Flexity trams can be built for both bi-directional and uni-directional systems. A low-floor design with multi-purpose areas is standard on most models, allowing easy access to the vehicles for wheelchair users. There are also high-floor configurations for Flexity LRVs, and can be designed for tram-train operations.

Flexity 2 
 

As Bombardier's premium tram model, the Flexity 2 tram is a 100% low-floor vehicle with improved corrosion resistance, impact protection, energy efficiency, and a more spacious interior resulting from the reduction of its sidewall widths. It is also compatible with Bombardier's PRIMOVE conductive battery charging system. These vehicles are currently used in Blackpool, Gold Coast, Basel, and Antwerp, among others.

Flexity Classic 

Being of a traditional appearance but with the same design features and technology as other vehicles, the 70% low floor Flexity Classic requires comparatively less maintenance compared to other Flexity tram models. They are primarily focused on providing high-capacity public transport in densely spaced urban areas. These vehicles are currently used in Adelaide, Dresden, Essen, Frankfurt and Kassel, among others.

Flexity Outlook 

With a 100% low floor, the Flexity Outlook range encompasses two different designs: the Eurotram and Cityrunner. Eurotram was originally conceived by Socimi of Italy as a distinctive, train-like tramcar with large windows and modules with both powered and unpowered bogies. Cityrunner has a more conventional appearance, but highly customizable and is future proof with its easily repairable modules. These vehicles are currently used in Strasbourg, Porto, Brussels, and Marseille, among others. Toronto is a customized variant of the Flexity Outlook.

Flexity Swift 
 

Designed as a bi-directional low or high-floor light rail vehicle, the Flexity Swift was conceived for use on high-speed interurban railways and light metros, with different body lengths and the ability to form multiple unit sets and be constructed to meet high crashworthiness standards. These vehicles are currently used in Cologne, Minneapolis, London, and Manchester, among others.

Flexity Link 
 
The Flexity Link tram-train has dual voltage capabilities and is compatible with mainline railway regulations (e.g. BOStrab) that permit operation on both urban tram networks and mainline railways, reducing transport infrastructure costs. Although this particular model is only used in Saarbrücken, a recent order has been made for dual-voltage Flexity Swift vehicles in Karlsruhe, where the tram-train concept was pioneered.

Flexity Freedom 
 

The Flexity Freedom is targeted at the North American market. Like the rest of Bombardier's Flexity models, it is locally made out of 100% low-floor modules, and features the same multiple unit capability as the Flexity Swift, with air conditioning and an easily configurable interior layout. Designed for the Transit City network in Toronto, Kitchener-Waterloo and other LRT projects in Ontario, the model has been selected for Edmonton's Valley Line and is being marketed by Bombardier for future orders within North America.

Customized solutions 

Variants of Bombardier's Flexity trams and streetcars have been specially designed for use in certain cities, such as Berlin, Vienna, and Toronto.

Berlin 

The Flexity Berlin was developed for the Berlin tram network, and is based on the older Incentro model developed by Adtranz. With a full 100% low floor interior, both uni-directional and bi-directional versions are used with either five or seven sections.

Vienna 
The Flexity Wien was developed for the Vienna tram network. Derived from the Flexity Berlin with elements of the Flexity 2 line, it is a five-section, 100% low-floor, uni-directional tram with a floor height of 215 millimeters, permitting sidewalk-level boarding in line with the Siemens ULF.

Toronto 

A derivative of the Flexity Outlook was created for the Toronto streetcar system to replace the aging CLRVs and ALRVs built by UTDC. It is five-section, air-conditioned, built to the TTC's unique track gauge of  TTC gauge, and fully compatible with the existing network.

Other models 
Bombardier has also manufactured other models of tram which they do not place in the Flexity family, including the Cobra for Zürich and the Incentro for Nantes and Nottingham. These models are no longer in production and have been succeeded by Flexity vehicles.

References

External links 

Bombardier's Flexity website

Alstom trams
Articulated passenger trains
Flexity